Martin’s Close is a supernatural television drama produced by the BBC. Running at 30 minutes, the drama was based on the ghost story Martin's Close by British writer and academic M. R. James, included in his 1911 collection More Ghost Stories of an Antiquary. Adapted and directed by Mark Gatiss, it was broadcast on 24 December 2019 on BBC Four as part of the long-running A Ghost Story for Christmas series and again on 24 December 2020.

Synopsis     
The narrator, Stanton (Simon Williams), tells the tale of a young squire, John Martin (Wilf Scolding), who in 1684 is prosecuted for murder by the King's Counsel (Peter Capaldi) in a court presided over by the notorious Judge Jeffreys (Elliot Levey). But Ann Clark (Jessica Temple), the simple-minded and poor country girl he is accused of murdering, has been seen after her death.

Cast

Peter Capaldi .. Dolben
Elliot Levey .. Judge Jeffreys
Wilf Scolding .. John Martin
Sara Crowe .. Sarah Arscott
James Holmes .. Thomas Snell
Jessica Temple .. Ann Clark
Simon Williams .. Stanton
Fisayo Akinade .. William
Ian Hallard .. Hosier

Adaptation
Giving the production three stars out of five, Tilly Pearce, the critic for Metro, wrote:
"It’s a snappy tale that doesn’t take too much of your time, and it’s got a fair amount of freaky moments that actually make your skin crawl a little bit."

Michael Hogan, the critic for The Daily Telegraph,  also giving three stars out of five, wrote:
"I must confess, I found the ending a mild disappointment. I found myself waiting for a twist or explanation that never came. Instead we were left with the haunting image of Martin being led off to the gallows and Ann's ghost gleefully joining the procession. This was eerie fare, rather than flat-out scary.

Budgetary limitations meant the simple story was told with a small cast and stripped-back.
stagey production... For a punchy half-hour piece, however, its storytelling style felt unnecessarily convoluted..."

Locations

The drama was filmed at Queen Elizabeth's Hunting Lodge in Epping Forest. The first floor Salon was used for the scene of the party where John Martin first encounters Ann Clark while the top floor was used for the court scenes.

References

External links

Adaptations of works by M. R. James
BBC television dramas
Television shows based on short fiction
A Ghost Story for Christmas
2019 television films